The Anguilloidei are a suborder of the order Anguilliformes (the eels) containing three families:

Anguillidae (freshwater eels)
Serrivomeridae (sawtooth eels)
Nemichthyidae (snipe eels)

This suborder traditionally included several other families that have recently been moved to new suborders: 
Chlopsidae (false morays), Heterenchelyidae (mud eels), Moringuidae (worm eels), Muraenidae (moray eels), and Myrocongridae (thin eels).

References

 

Eels
Ray-finned fish suborders